Dholan Hithar is a big village of Kasur Tehsil in the Punjab province of Pakistan. Dholan Hithar is a Union Council Number 37 of Kasur District. The population of Dholan Hithar is 40,000. It has two government high schools, one for boys and one for girls, and one primary school for boys. Famous villages of Dholan Hithar union council are sher kot, Kachapakka, Nainwal, Tibba Nainwal, Mandi Dholan. Dholan Hithar is a very beautiful village in Punjab. This village creates many great people, that are serving for the progress of Pakistan.A lot of Engineers graduated that belong to Dholan Hithar and serving the industry, son of Haji Basheer Ahmad Umar Farooq (Software Engineer ) at Devsinc, Zaheer Ahmad (Electrical Engineer) at Airlink, Naeem Ahmad serving the Pakistan Navy, Muneer Ahmad (Line superintendent at Lesco Wapda). Abdul Mannan S/O Sana Ullah Saddiqui belongs to this village is a  well-known ASO (App Store Optimizer) in IT Industry, has worked as a project manager and as a head of the different departments of different IT companies in Islamabad and Lahore. Major Dr. Muhammad Shafiq is the first Army Officer serving in Pakistan Army. He is also the first Ph.D. of Dholan Hithar and of all the Union Council villages. The celebrity of this area is Chaudhry Sarfraz Ahmed Bajwa. Dholan Hithar is connected with the other cities of Pakistan by Railways and road networks. Muhammad Usman Arshad is the first student from this village to be admitted on merit to the best Engineering university in Pakistan i.e. UET Lahore. He is doing Chemical Engineering. Muhammad Usman Arshad is the future ACP (Assistant Commissioner in Police) officer who will brighten the name of his parents and his village, God willing, because he loves CSS and wants to become a CSP officer. Hafiz Shafiq son of Hafiz Muhammad Mushtaq graduated from UET and served in LDA.

Populated places in Kasur District